Campo Tre Fontane is a sports venue located in Rome, Italy. For the 1960 Summer Olympics, it hosted seven field hockey matches.

The camp is part of the Tre Fontane Sports Zone, and is home to S.S. Lazio Hockey Prato.

References
1960 Summer Olympics official report. Volume 1. p. 76.
1960 Summer Olympic official report. Volume 2. Part 1. pp. 437–60.
Lalaziosiamonoi.it profile. 

Venues of the 1960 Summer Olympics
Olympic field hockey venues
Sports venues in Italy